Kala Ghoda (IPA:Kāḷā Ghōḍā,(काला घोडा)) is a crescent-shaped art district/neighborhood in Mumbai, India. It hosts several of the city's heritage buildings including museums, art galleries and educational institutions like the Chhatrapati Shivaji Maharaj Vastu Sangrahalaya, the Jehangir Art Gallery, the National Gallery of Modern Art, and The Arts Trust - Institute of Contemporary Indian Art.

The area hosts the Kala Ghoda Arts Festival annually in February. The area is sandwiched between Mumbai Port's docklands to the east, Regal Cinema to the south, Hutatma Chowk and Flora Fountain to the north and Oval Maidan to the west. The Bombay Stock Exchange is to its north east.

History
The name Kala Ghoda is a reference to the presence of a black stone statue of King Edward VII (as the then Prince of Wales) mounted on a horse that was built by Jewish businessman and philanthropist Albert Abdullah David Sassoon, although this statue was removed from the precinct in 1965 and subsequently placed inside the Byculla Zoo. A local legend stated that the statues of King Edward and the one of Shivaji on a horse at the Gateway of India came to life after midnight and battled it out on the streets.  In 2017, the 'Kala Ghoda' returned to the area with a new statue of a similar looking horse without a rider, being commissioned by the Kala Ghoda Association. The statue, titled 'Spirit of Kala Ghoda' was designed by architect Alfaz Miller and sculpted by Shreehari Bhosle.

Prior to the founding of the Bombay Stock Exchange, merchants often traded shares at the junction of Rampart row and Meadow street.

Landmarks

The Esplanade Mansion, India's oldest surviving cast iron building, is in Kala Ghoda. Formerly known as Watson's Hotel, it was the site where films were introduced to India with a screening of the Lumiere Brothers Cinematograph in 1896. The offices of art publication, Marg, are on the third floor of the historic Army and Navy Building.

See also
 Kala Ghoda Arts Festival

References

External links

 Kala Ghoda Art Festival Organizing Committee
 A History of the District
 Kala Ghoda 2009

Neighbourhoods in Mumbai
Public art in Mumbai